Nenad Šulović (Serbian Cyrillic: Ненад Шуловић; born October 3, 1985) is a Serbian professional basketball player for Dynamic Belgrade of the Basketball League of Serbia.

Professional career
Šulović started his career with Beovuk 72. For the 2006–07 season he moved to OKK Beograd. For the 2007–08 season he signed with Polpak Świecie of the Polish Basketball League.

For the 2008–09 season he signed with Napredak Kruševac. In February 2009, he left Napredak and signed with MBK Rieker Komárno of the Slovak Extraliga for the rest of the season.

On June 22, 2009, he signed with the Romanian team CS Otopeni. In December 2009, Otopeni released him. In February 2010, he returned to Serbia and signed with OKK Beograd for the rest of the season.

For the 2010–11 season he returned to Napredak Kruševac. In March 2011, he left Napredak and signed with Radnički Kragujevac for the rest of the season.

On August 18, 2011, he signed with the Bosnian team Igokea. On July 1, 2012, he re-signed with Igokea for one more season. In his second season with the club, he won the Bosnian League and Cup.

In July 2013, he signed with Zepter Vienna of the Österreichische Basketball Bundesliga for the 2013–14 season.

On October 6, 2014, he signed with the Bulgarian team Balkan Botevgrad. On March 2, 2015, he left Balkan and signed with Mega Leks for the rest of the season.

On June 30, 2015, he signed with Dinamo București of Romania.

On September 14, 2016, he signed with SZTE-Szedeák for the 2016–17 season.

References

External links
 Nenad Šulović at aba-liga.com
 Nenad Šulović at eurobasket.com
 Nenad Šulović at realgm.com

1985 births
Living people
ABA League players
Basketball players from Belgrade
Basketball League of Serbia players
BC Zepter Vienna players
KK Beovuk 72 players
KK Dynamic players
KK Igokea players
KK Mega Basket players
KK Radnički Kragujevac (2009–2014) players
KK Napredak Kruševac players
OKK Beograd players
PVSK Panthers players
SCM U Craiova (basketball) players
Serbian men's basketball players
Serbian expatriate basketball people in Austria
Serbian expatriate basketball people in Bulgaria
Serbian expatriate basketball people in Hungary
Serbian expatriate basketball people in Poland
Serbian expatriate basketball people in Romania
Serbian expatriate basketball people in Slovakia
SZTE-Szedeák players
Centers (basketball)
Power forwards (basketball)